William Selman may refer to two MPs for Plympton Erle:
William Selman I
William Selman II